Zenon Jankowski (born 22 November 1937 in Poznań, Poland) is a retired Polish pilot, colonel of the Polish Army and cosmonaut.

Jankowski was selected as backup cosmonaut of the 1st Polish cosmonaut Mirosław Hermaszewski for the Soyuz 30 mission in 1978.
He had one child.

External links
Spacefacts biography of Zenon Jankowski  http://www.spacefacts.de/bios/international/english/jankowski_zenon.htm

1937 births
Living people
Polish aviators
Polish astronauts
Polish Army officers